In enzymology, a tabersonine 16-O-methyltransferase is an enzyme that catalyzes the chemical reaction

S-adenosyl-L-methionine + 16-hydroxytabersonine  S-adenosyl-L-homocysteine + 16-methoxytabersonine

Thus, the two substrates of this enzyme are S-adenosyl methionine and 16-hydroxytabersonine, whereas its two products are S-adenosylhomocysteine and 16-methoxytabersonine.

This enzyme belongs to the family of transferases, specifically those transferring one-carbon group methyltransferases.  The systematic name of this enzyme class is S-adenosyl-L-methionine:16-hydroxytabersonine 16-O-methyltransferase. Other names in common use include 11-demethyl-17-deacetylvindoline 11-methyltransferase, 11-O-demethyl-17-O-deacetylvindoline O-methyltransferase, S-adenosyl-L-methionine:11-O-demethyl-17-O-deacetylvindoline, and 11-O-methyltransferase.  This enzyme participates in terpene indole and ipecac alkaloid biosynthesis.

References

 
 

EC 2.1.1
Enzymes of unknown structure